GRS 1915+105 or V1487 Aquilae is an X-ray binary star system which features a regular star and a black hole. It was discovered on August 15, 1992 by the WATCH all-sky monitor aboard Granat. "GRS" stands for "GRANAT source", "1915" is the right ascension (19 hours and 15 minutes) and "105" reflects the approximate declination (10 degrees and 56 arcminutes). The near-infrared counterpart was confirmed by spectroscopic observations. The binary system lies 11,000 parsecs away in Aquila. GRS 1915+105 is the heaviest of the stellar black holes so far known in the Milky Way Galaxy, with 10 to 18 times the mass of the Sun. It is also a microquasar, and it appears that the black hole rotates at least 950 times per second, close to the maximum of 1,150 times per second, with a spin parameter value between 0.82 and 1.00 (maximum possible value).

Galactic superluminal source 

In 1994, GRS 1915+105 became the first known galactic source that ejects material with apparent superluminal motion velocities.

Observations with high resolution radio telescopes such as VLA, MERLIN, and VLBI show a bi-polar outflow of charged particles, which emit synchrotron radiation at radio frequencies. These studies have shown that the apparent superluminal motion is due to a relativistic effect known as relativistic aberration, where the intrinsic velocity of ejecta is actually about 90% the speed of light.

Growth regulation 

Repeat observations by the Chandra X-Ray Observatory over the period of a decade have revealed what may be a mechanism for self-regulation of the rate of growth of GRS 1915+105.  The jet of materials being ejected is occasionally choked off by a hot wind blowing off the accretion disk.  The wind deprives the jet of materials needed to sustain it.  When the wind dies down, the jet returns.

See also 

 GRO J1655-40

References

External links
 A Very Massive Stellar Black Hole in the Milky Way Galaxy November 28, 2001 (ESO)
 Image V1487 Aquilae
 O maior buraco negro estelar da Via Láctea (The biggest stellar black hole of the Milky Way) - in Portuguese.
 MICRO-QUASAR WITHIN OUR GALAXY
 The micro quasar GRS 1915+105 INTEGRAL Science Data Centre

X-ray binaries
Aquila (constellation)
Microquasars
Aquilae, V1487
K-type giants